Anatrachyntis simplex is a moth in the family Cosmopterigidae. It is found on Egypt, La Réunion, Gambia and the United Arab Emirates, Cyprus, Morocco, Portugal, Spain, India and China. It is recorded infrequently in Great Britain through accidental importation in pomegranates.

The wingspan is about 10 mm. In Europe, adults have been recorded in August and October. In the tropics there are multiple generations per year.

The larvae feed within the fruit of pomegranates. In Africa they have also been recorded feeding on Elaeis guineensis (African oil palm) (Arecaceae), Zea mays (Poaceae), Gossypium sp. and Ceiba pentandra (Malvaceae), as well as flowers of Pandanus sp. and Typha domingensis (Typhaceae)

References

External links
images at boldsystems.org

Moths described in 1891
Anatrachyntis
Moths of Africa
Moths of Europe
Moths of Asia